= Peter Lennox-Kerr =

Peter Lennox-Kerr (1927 – 22 July 2007) was an internationally known British textile journalist.

== Life ==
He was an expert reporting on the development of synthetic fibres. He died in Derbyshire, on 22 July 2007.

== Bibliography ==
- Index to man-made fibres of the world (editor)
- Flexible textile composites 1973
- The World Fibres Book 1972. Textile Trade Press
- Deskbook of World Fibers, McGraw-Hill, 1981, ISBN 9780076067879
- Lennox-Kerr, Peter. "Government measures to make textile industry competitive." Times, 24 Apr. 1973, p. VII. The Times Digital Archive.
- Lennox-Kerr, Peter. "Textile manufacturers look towards SE Asia openings." Times, 8 May 1973, p. VII. The Times Digital Archive.
